Booing is an act of publicly showing displeasure for someone or something, such as an entertainer or an athlete, by loudly yelling "Boo!" and sustaining the "oo" sound by holding it out. People may also make hand signs such as the thumbs down sign. If spectators particularly dislike the performance they may also accompany booing by throwing rotten fruit on stage.

Players booed for their performance felt booing "spooked" or "bothered" them or their teammates, and that it "affected their performance". Nick Swisher stated "It hurts. Sometimes I'm a sensitive guy and some of the things people say, they get under your skin a little bit." Ledley King stated, "It just frustrates me when the crowd boo England, who is that going to help? It just heaps more pressure on the players and gives us even less of a chance of scoring". However, the counterargument goes that the combination of booing and applause help keep the quality of public performance high, by emotionally rewarding the good and punishing the bad.

Booing is not always a judgement of performance, but can be an expression of disapproval of a third party.

Sports

In sports, booing by fans is quite common. They may boo particularly-hated players on the opposing team (such as when they leave their original team to individually sign with another team in free agency, or get traded to said team and sign for a significant amount of money), or any opposing player when there is an intense rivalry between the teams. Unsportsmanlike behavior is also booed, such as intentionally hitting home team batters in baseball or diving in association football or basketball (where it is a technical foul). Booing of referees or umpires after an unpopular ruling is also common. Booing of expelled players after receiving a second yellow card or a direct red card is also common for many reasons. In professional sports, one's own home team, players or coach may be booed due to a poor performance or season.

Examples

 In 1968, fans of the Philadelphia Eagles of the National Football League infamously booed and threw snowballs at a man dressed as Santa Claus in what became known as the Philadelphia Eagles Santa Claus incident.
 Adam Goodes who played for the Sydney Swans in the Australian Football League was repeatedly and loudly booed by opposition fans during the 2015 AFL season at most of the matches whenever he touched the ball. During a match against Carlton, during the AFL's annual Indigenous Round, after he kicked a goal, he celebrated the goal by performing an Aboriginal war dance in which he mimed throwing a spear in their direction. Afterwards, Goodes claimed that the dance was based on the one he learned from the under-16s Indigenous team the Flying Boomerangs, and that it was intended as an expression of indigenous pride during Indigenous Round, not with the intention of offending and intimidating the crowd.
 Brazilian motor racing driver Emerson Fittipaldi was booed when he, after winning the 1993 Indianapolis 500, chose to drink orange juice instead of the milk traditionally drunk by winners of the race. Fittipaldi had made the move in order to promote the Brazilian citrus industry.
 During professional wrestling matches, all heels traditionally receive boos from the audience as the villain. The ability to infuriate audiences and draw "heat" (negative reactions such as boos and jeers) is considered an essential skill for all heel performers.
 NFL fans booed players from the Kansas City Chiefs and Houston Texans prior to the coin toss of their game in the beginning of the 2020 season, as the Houston Texans emerged from the locker room. The Houston Texans had stayed in the locker room during the national anthem in a statement for racial justice. The booing continued as they interlocked arms midfield with the Kansas City Chiefs during what was supposed to be a moment of silence.
NHL commissioner Gary Bettman is booed whenever he makes an appearance in front of fans, notably at the NHL Entry Draft and at the ceremony to present the Stanley Cup to the league's champion.
 At The Game Awards 2015, the audience booed in disapproval at the announcement that Konami legally barred Hideo Kojima from making an appearance. Host Geoff Keighley agreed with the sentiment, saying, "it's disappointing and it's inconceivable to me that an artist like Hideo would not be allowed to come here and celebrate with his peers and his fellow teammates."
 In 2019, Toronto Maple Leafs hockey player John Tavares, who formerly played for the New York Islanders, was heavily booed by Islanders fans when he played his first game at the Nassau Veterans Memorial Coliseum after signing with the Maple Leafs during the 2018 NHL Free Agency period. Fans booed Tavares during the warm-ups and threw items at him as he headed towards the dressing room at the end of the warm-ups, as well as when a tribute video honoring him was played on the jumbotron, in addition to loudly heckling him throughout the game. Prior to the game, some fans repurposed their old Tavares jerseys and made merchandise with the message "TR91TOR" on it (a reference to Tavares' jersey number when he was an Islander and the team he signed with during the Free Agency). The Islanders won the game 6–1. The booing and heckling was condemned by many, including by New York Rangers alum Sean Avery, whose team has had a notable intra-city rivalry with the Islanders throughout the years.
 In 2022, Denver Broncos quarterback Russell Wilson, who formerly played for the Seattle Seahawks, was heavily booed by Seahawks fans in his first game back at Lumen Field as a Bronco after being traded to the Broncos from the Seahawks and then signing a five-year contract extension worth $245 million prior to the season beginning, while his back-up (who then became the starter for the Seahawks after his departure), Geno Smith, was cheered and met with chants of "Geno! Geno! Geno!". Wilson was also booed when he appeared on the jumbotron at WNBA player Sue Bird's final home game with the Seattle Storm at Climate Pledge Arena a month before his Broncos debut.
 In 2023, Columbus Blue Jackets hockey player Johnny Gaudreau, who formerly played for the Calgary Flames, was booed heavily by Flames fans when he played his first game at Scotiabank Saddledome as a member of the Blue Jackets after signing with the Blue Jackets during the 2022 NHL Free Agency period. During the free agency period that happened in the summer of 2022, the Flames initially offered Gaudreau an 8-year contract with an AAV of $10.5 million per year, but Gaudreau turned down the Flames’ offer. This would have made Gaudreau, a player who finished the 2022 campaign second in the scoring race with 40 goals and 75 assists for 115 points, one of the highest paid players in the league, as well as the highest paid player in Calgary Flames history, had he accepted the offer. Speculations around the NHL were that Gaudreau, a New Jersey native, would sign with either the Philadelphia Flyers or the New Jersey Devils in order to be not too far away from his hometown should he choose to not remain a Flame. Instead, Gaudreau stunned the hockey community by signing with the Blue Jackets for a lesser amount of time and money — 7 years with a $9.75 million AAV. The move was not well received in Calgary and was even mocked by a local newscaster that summer. During the game, Gaudreau was booed heavily every time he touched the puck, as well as during the warmups. The boos made way for cheers, albeit temporarily, when the Flames played a tribute video to honor him, but the boos returned when play resumed. He also had a penalty shot attempt in that game, where he was also booed, but missed the shot, to the delight of the Flames fans in attendance. The Flames won the game 4–3 in overtime. Gaudreau had two assists in the game for the Blue Jackets.

Politics

In the Parliament of the United Kingdom, booing is officially not permitted; Erskine May states: "Members must not disturb a Member who is speaking by hissing, chanting, clapping, booing, exclamations or other interruption." Nevertheless, jeering and heckling are somewhat common during Prime Minister's Questions.

Popular culture
Although rare in the performing arts, opera remains one of the arts where booing remains, if not common, customary as merited.

Rarer still is for motion pictures to be booed at their openings, and this is usually confined to film festivals when the production team is present.

In traditional British pantomime, the audience is generally encouraged to direct boos and possibly other forms of put-downs towards the antagonist(s), while the protagonist and other positive characters are  celebrated.

Narrative

The film The Princess Bride uses booing to show shame. Princess Buttercup dreams of her wedding with Humperdinck when an elderly woman interrupts:

The book Dreams on Film: The Cinematic Struggle Between Art and Science says this scene might be better labeled "Buttercup Unconsciously Booing Herself".

See also
 Audience participation
 Heckler
 Whistling in sports
 New York Philharmonic concert of April 6, 1962
 List of classical music with an unruly audience response

References

External links
 Where Do Hecklers Come From? The origins of booing on Slate.

Human communication
Show business terms
Criticisms